Singles 89–92 is Unsane's first compilation album, released in 1992 through Matador Records. Like the title suggests, the album is composed of singles the band released between 1989 and 1992.

Reception

Writing in Allmusic several years after its release, John Bush said that these singles "show an intriguing facet of drone-metal not seen before."

Track listing

Personnel

Unsane
Charlie Ondras – drums
Pete Shore – bass guitar
Chris Spencer – vocals, guitar

Additional musicians and production
Jens Jürgensen – photography

References

Unsane albums
1992 compilation albums
Albums produced by Wharton Tiers
Matador Records compilation albums